The Protecteur-class auxiliary oiler replenishment (AOR) ships were used by the Royal Canadian Navy to resupply ships at sea with food, munitions, fuel and spare parts. They had more sophisticated medical and dental facilities than smaller warships. At  the ships were some of the largest operated by the RCN. Entering service in 1969, the last vessel of the class was paid off in 2016.

General characteristics

Protecteur-class oilers carried a crew of three hundred and sixty five men and women, including 27 officers, and 45 air detachment personnel who operated and supported three embarked CH-124 Sea King helicopters.

Two 20 mm Phalanx close-in weapon system points and six .50 calibre machine guns helped protect the cargo and crew of the Protecteur class if their BAE Systems Mark 36 SRBOC chaff launchers or AN/SLQ-25 Nixie towed decoy did not prevent enemy weaponry from endangering the ship.

Ships in class
The Royal Canadian Navy listed the following two ships in the Protecteur class. Both ships were built by Saint John Shipbuilding.

Retirement and future
General wear and tear notwithstanding, Protecteur was involved in a very serious engine room fire in February 2014 and more recently corrosion problems were found on Preserver. On 27 November 2015, Protecteur and Algonquin were sold to R.J. MacIsaac Ltd. of Antigonish, Nova Scotia for scrapping. They were towed to Liverpool, Nova Scotia, where the vessels were to be broken up. Preserver was paid off on 21 October 2016.

Plans for replacing the class were first introduced in 2004. Lack of spare parts for the boilers and the fact that the Protecteur class are monohull tankers were the main driving points to replacing the class. The ships were intended to continue to operate until 2017, however, the Joint Support Ship Project will not be completed until two years later, leaving a gap in the ability for the RCN to refuel and resupply her own ships while deployed.

The Royal Canadian Navy looked at other options to fill the gap until the arrival of the two s in 2019 at the earliest. The navy is currently leasing replenishment vessels from other navies, and converted a civilian container ship to a replenishment vessel.

References

External links

 Protecteur class overview

 
Cold War naval ships of Canada
Auxiliary replenishment ship classes